Fengchengite is a rare mineral of the eudialyte group with the formula . The formula is simplified as it does not show the presence of cyclic silicate groups. 
When compared to other minerals of the group, fengchengite characterizes in the presence of ferric iron (thus similar to ikranite, mogovidite and feklichevite) and essential, site-dominating vacancies. The mineral was discovered in the Saima complex near Fengcheng city in China - hence its name.

References

Further reading
 Johnsen, O., Ferraris, G., Gault, R.A., Grice, D.G., Kampf, A.R., and Pekov, I.V., 2003. The nomenclature of eudialyte-group minerals. The Canadian Mineralogist 41, 785-794

Calcium minerals
Cyclosilicates
Iron(III) minerals
Sodium minerals
Zirconium minerals
Trigonal minerals
Minerals in space group 166